Avi Katz (born 1949) is a veteran Israeli illustrator and cartoonist.

Early life and education
Katz was born in Philadelphia, PA, USA. Throughout his years as a student in the Jewish day school system (Solomon Schechter and Akiba), he studied art at the Fleisher Art Memorial. He studied for three years at the University of California, Berkeley, exhibiting two one-man shows, and in 1970 transferred to the Bezalel Academy of Arts and Design in Jerusalem, Israel. After graduating in Fine Arts in 1973, he decided to make his home permanently in Israel.

Career
After several years of teaching and exhibiting paintings, Katz opted for illustration as a full-time career. In the ensuing years he has illustrated some 160 books in Israel and the United States, most of them realistically drawn novels for young readers on real-life and historical subjects. Eight of his books won Israel's Ze'ev Prize, and four received International Board on Books for Young People Hans Christian Andersen Honors. In 2009, his JPS Illustrated Bible, authored by Ellen Frankel, won the 2009 National Jewish Book Award for Illustrated Children's Book and was a Sidney Taylor Notable Book; The Waiting Wall was also a Taylor Notable. He is a member of Society of Children's Book Writers and Illustrators and the Israel Association of Illustrators.

Throughout the 1980s, Katz illustrated for the Davar daily until its demise, and for the short-lived The Nation, creating daily comic strips in both. From its first issue in 1990, he has been the staff artist of the bi-weekly news magazine The Jerusalem Report. Around 2014, the Jerusalem Report was making cuts to its staff and expenses, and Avi Katz was regretfully dropped from the publication. So many readers protested that he was reinstated, and he returned to great acclaim. He is a member of the Israel Society of Caricaturists and regularly exhibits in the Holon Museum of Cartoons and Comics. He is also active in the Cartooning for Peace program and has exhibited with this group around the world.

Katz is a long-time science fiction and fantasy fan and is active in the Israeli Society for SF&F. He created all the cover paintings for the society's quarterly, The Tenth Dimension, and has exhibited his art at WorldCon. Katz lives in Ramat Gan, Israel.

In 2018, Katz was fired by the Jerusalem Post shortly after publishing a cartoon of Benjamin Netanyahu, depicting him and his entourage as pigs.

Family
He is married to the sculptor Rachel London Katz, and has three sons: violist Shmuel Katz; cellist Mickey Katz; and graphic designer Itamar Katz.

References

External links 
 Avi Katz's website
 https://web.archive.org/web/20100915041101/http://www.jewishbookcouncil.org/page.php?7
 http://www.ibby.org/index.php?id=270

Living people
Israeli cartoonists
Israeli illustrators
1949 births